Kaapo Kakko (born 13 February 2001) is a Finnish professional ice hockey forward for the New York Rangers of the National Hockey League (NHL). Kakko was selected second overall by the Rangers in the 2019 NHL Entry Draft. Kakko plays right wing, but also has experience playing at centre. He made his professional debut playing with TPS of the Finnish Liiga.

Playing career

New York Rangers
On 21 June 2019, as the top-ranked European skater heading into the 2019 NHL Entry Draft, Kakko was selected second overall by the New York Rangers. On 11 July 2019, he was signed to a three-year, entry-level contract with the Rangers.

Kakko made his NHL debut for the Rangers on 3 October 2019. He scored his first NHL career goal on 12 October at home against the Edmonton Oilers, becoming the eighth player in Rangers franchise history to score a goal at the age of 18 or younger. He also became the second player in NHL history born in the 21st century to score a goal, after Ville Heinola (also born in 2001), of the Winnipeg Jets who scored a goal just hours before Kakko on the same day.

Following the conclusion of his entry-level contract with the Rangers, Kakko as a restricted free agent was re-signed to a two-year, $4.2 million contract extension with New York on 28 July 2022.

International play

Kakko scored the gold-medal-winning goal for team Finland in the 2019 World Junior Ice Hockey Championships on 5 January 2019. Kakko is the youngest player in hockey history to win gold in all three IIHF world championship tournaments: the World U18 Championships, the World Junior Championships and the World Championships.

Personal life
Kakko has Type 1 diabetes and celiac disease.

Career statistics

Regular season and playoffs

International

Awards and honours

References

External links
 

2001 births
Living people
Finnish expatriate ice hockey players in the United States
Finnish ice hockey right wingers
National Hockey League first-round draft picks
New York Rangers draft picks
New York Rangers players
People with type 1 diabetes
Sportspeople from Turku
HC TPS players